"I Wish" is a song by American singer Stevie Wonder. It was released in late 1976 as the lead single from his eighteenth album, Songs in the Key of Life (1976). Written and produced by Wonder, the song focuses on his childhood from the 1950s into the early 1960s about how he wished he could go back and relive it. The single hit number one on the Billboard Hot 100 and soul singles chart. At the 19th Grammy Awards, Stevie Wonder won the Best R&B Vocal Performance, Male for this song.

Composition
Wonder recollected how the music for "I Wish" came to him:
The day I wrote it was a Saturday, the day of a Motown picnic in the summer of '76.  God, I remember that because I was having this really bad toothache. It was ridiculous...I had such a good time at the picnic that I went to Crystal Recording Studio right afterward and the vibe came right to my mind – running at the picnic, the contests, we all participated.  It was a lot of fun ... and from that came the 'I Wish' vibe."

The lyrics came with more difficulty.  The lyrics that wound up in the song deal with childhood and teenage experiences. But originally Wonder wanted to address broader topics.  Wonder said he originally tried to incorporate "a lot of cosmic type stuff, spiritual stuff. But I couldn’t do that 'cause the music was too much fun — the words didn’t have the fun of the track," and that he "couldn't come up with anything stronger than the chorus, 'I wish those days [claps] would [claps] come back once more.' Thank goodness we didn't change that."

For the television series Classic Albums, Wonder recreated a small section from the song to demonstrate how he composed and arranged it. He played the keyboards and drums himself, and used most of the musicians that recorded the original.

Reception
Cash Box said that the song was chosen as the lead single from Songs in the Key of Life after "radio stations spent weeks determining which... cut the public wanted most" and "'I Wish' came out on top in terms of popularity and editability."  Record World said that "this popular and much requested track should be a major hit."

Charts

Weekly charts

Year-end charts

Certifications

See also
Stevie Wonder discography

References

1976 singles
1976 songs
Billboard Hot 100 number-one singles
Cashbox number-one singles
RPM Top Singles number-one singles
Stevie Wonder songs
Songs written by Stevie Wonder
Motown singles
Tamla Records singles
Song recordings produced by Stevie Wonder